Katzir is a community settlement in northern Israel. Located south-west of Umm al-Fahm and close to the Green Line, it falls under the jurisdiction of Menashe Regional Council.

History
The village was established in 1982 by Hitahdut HaIkarim on land owned by the Jewish Agency, and was initially a community settlement. In 1993 it was merged with neighbouring Harish to form Katzir-Harish local council. However, in 2012 the two were separated, with Harish remaining a local council and Katzir reverting to the jurisdiction of Menashe Regional Council.

References

External links
Official website

Community settlements
Menashe Regional Council
Populated places in Haifa District
Populated places established in 1982
1982 establishments in Israel
Hitahdut HaIkarim